

List

By-election

1979
20 September: London, South West—The Home Secretary announced on 11 July 1979 that Shelagh Roberts was disqualified from election due to her membership of the Occupational Pensions Board, which was an 'office of profit under the Crown'. She resigned from the board and was re-elected at the by-election.

Change of allegiance

 Michael Gallagher announced on 5 January 1984 that he had joined the Social Democratic Party.

References 

1979
List
United Kingdom